Prasert Prasarttong-Osoth (born 22 March 1933) is a Thai billionaire businessman of Chinese descent, former surgeon, and the founder and owner of Bangkok Dusit Medical Services, Thailand's largest private healthcare group, and a regional airline, Bangkok Airways. As of August 2018, Forbes estimated his net worth at US$3.5 billion.

Early and personal life
Prasert received a bachelor's degree from Faculty of Medicine Siriraj Hospital, Mahidol University, after which he qualified as a medical doctor.

He is married with five children and lives in Bangkok. In January 2019, the Securities and Exchange Commission of Thailand fined him and his daughter 500 million baht for insider trading of Bangkok Airways shares.

References

Prasarttong-Osoth Co., Ltd.
Prasert Prasarttong-Osoth
Prasert Prasarttong-Osoth
Prasert Prasarttong-Osoth
Prasert Prasarttong-Osoth
Prasert Prasarttong-Osoth
1933 births
Living people
Prasert Prasarttong-Osoth